Lawrie Nelson is a former Australian racing driver who raced from 1969 until 2018. Out of over 130 races that he participated in, Nelson won 1 race in 1979 and made the podium in 5 races in 1973 (twice), 1979, 2008 and 2016.

References

1943 births
Living people
Australian racing drivers